The Khasic or Khasian languages are a family of Austroasiatic languages spoken in the northeastern Indian state Meghalaya and neighbouring areas of Bangladesh.

Languages

Sidwell (2018: 27–31) classifies the Khasian languages as follows.
Proto-Khasian
War (Amwi, Mnar)
Proto–Pnar-Khasi-Lyngngam
Lyngngam (former Garo-speakers)
Pnar (Jaintia), Khasi, Maharam (Maram)

Varieties called Bhoi are dialects of both Pnar and Khasi.

External relationships
Paul Sidwell (2011) suggests that Khasian is closely related to Palaungic, forming a Khasi–Palaungic branch.

The following eight Khasian-Palaungic isoglosses have been identified by Sidwell (2018: 32).

Lexical innovations
Sidwell (2018: 23) lists the following Khasian lexical innovations (i.e., defining lexical forms) that are found exclusively in the Khasian branch, but not in other Austroasiatic branches).

Reconstruction
Proto-Khasian and Proto-Pnar-Khasi-Lyngngam have been reconstructed by Paul Sidwell (2018). Proto-Khasian is estimated to have originated about 2,000-2,500 years ago, with War splitting from other Khasian linguistic varieties about 1,500 years ago (Sidwell 2018: 20).

Proto-Khasian morphology includes a causative *pN- prefix and verbalizing *-r- infix (Sidwell 2018: 66-67).

The following reconstructed paradigmatic and closed class morphemes in Proto-Khasian are from Sidwell (2018: 51-67).

Personal pronouns

Demonstratives
 *ni 'proximal'
 *tu 'mesiodistal'
 *taj 'distal (visible)'
 *te 'mesioproximal'
 *tɛ 'distal (non-visible)'

Negators
 *ʔǝm 'not'
 *ham 'do not'
 *ta 'not'

Prepositions/case markers
 *ha 'locative/oblique'
 *ʤɔŋ 'to possess'
 *da 'instrumental'
 *ba (?) 'and/with'
 *tV 'oblique'

Tense/aspect morphemes
 *la:j 'to go'
 *dɛp 'finish'
 *diʔ 'to go'
 *daː 'have'
 *ʤuʔ 'same'

Morphological affixes
 *pN- 'prefix'
 *-r- 'verbalizer'

Numerals

Sound changes
Sidwell (2018) lists the following sound changes from Pre-Khasian (i.e., the ancestral stage of Khasian that preceded Proto-Khasian) to Proto-Khasian.
Pre-Khasian *b- > *p-, *ɓ- > *b- chain shift
Proto-Austroasiatic *b- > proto-Khasian *p-
Proto-Austroasiatic *ɓ- > proto-Khasian *b-
Pre-Khasian *d- > *t-, * ɗ- > *d- chain shift
Proto-Austroasiatic *d- > proto-Khasian *t-
Proto-Austroasiatic *ɗ- > proto-Khasian *d-
Pre-Khasian *-l > *-n/*-Ø
Pre-Khasian *-h > *-s > *-t
Pre-Khasian *-ʔ > *-Ø >, *-k > *-ʔ chain shift
Pre-Khasian *g- > *k-

See also
List of Proto-Khasian reconstructions (Wiktionary)

References

Sidwell, Paul. 2011. Proto-Khasian and Khasi-Palaungic. Journal of the South East Asia linguistics society, Vol. 4.2, pages 144-168, December 2011.
Sidwell, Paul. 2011b. Proto-Khasian (or -War-Khasi); reconstruction and classification. Presented at SEALS 21, Kasetsart University, Bangkok, Thailand.
Sidwell, Paul. 2018. The Khasian Languages: Classification, Reconstruction, and Comparative Lexicon. Languages of the World 58. Munich: Lincom Europa.

External links
Khasian Languages Project (by Paul Sidwell)